Muhyi ad-Din Muzaffar Jang Hidayat (died 13 February 1751) was the ruler of Hyderabad from 1750 until his death in 1751. His official name was Nawab Hidayat Muhi ud-din Sa'adu'llah Khan Bahadur, Muzaffar Jang, Nawab Subadar of the Deccan. He was also given a very pompous title like his predecessor and rival Nasir Jung; it was Nawab Khan Bahadur, Muzaffar Jung, Nawab Subadar of the Deccan. He became famously known as Muzaffar Jung.

Birth
He was born to Nawab Talib Muhi ud-din Mutawassil Khan Rustum Jang Bahadur,  who was the Naib Subahdar (Deputy Governor) of Bijapur and his wife Sahibzadi Khair-un-nisa Begum, who was the daughter of Nizam-ul-Mulk.

Reign
As per the 1749 British records of Fort St. George, Nizam-ul-Mulk even thought about installing Muzaffar Jung when he was dissatisfied with the conduct of Nasir Jung. He gave up that idea due to possible serious repercussions and reconciled with Nasir Jung. He recommended for bestowing the Circars of Adoni and Raichur to Muzaffar Jung with acceptance of the Padishah.

Initially, he was appointed to an Imperial mansab of 3,000 zat and 2,000 sowar and later promoted to 4,000 zat on his appointment to Bijapur. He was Subadar of Bijapur after the death of his father. When his grandfather Nizam-ul-Mulk died in 1748, he decided to stake his claim to the throne in opposition to his uncle, Nasir Jung. This resulted in the first major direct involvement of the Europeans in Indian domestic politics. He joined hands with his Carnatic ally Chanda Sahib and the French while Nasir Jung joined hands with his Carnatic ally Muhammad Ali Khan Walajah and the British. Eventually, the serious situation in Deccan and Carnatic would result in the Second Carnatic War. During the war Muzaffar Jung was briefly captured in March, 1750 after the Battle of Villianur. But after the assassination of Nasir Jung, he was released and took the throne of Hyderabad, 16 December 1750. He granted territories and titles to Dupleix and the French on 31 December 1750. He failed however, to honor his Afghan allies in a similar way. The resulting disagreement led to the Battle of Lakkireddipalli Pass in the Rayachoti taluka, Kadapa district, where the Nawab of Kurnool struck him in the head with a spear, 13 February 1751 killing him instantly. Muzzafar Jung's death lead to the deaths of the Nawab of Kurnool, Himmat Bahadur and Nawab of Savanur, Abdul Majid Khan I.

At this critical juncture in history the French commander De Bussy made the decision to install Salabat Jung as the new Nizam.

Family
Muzaffar Jang had only one son named, Nawab Muhammad Sa'ad ud-din Khan Bahadur who was a  minor at the death of his father in February 1751. He became Subedar of Bijapur in 1751. But died later from smallpox.

Positions held
Subadar of Bijapur.

See also
Hyderabad State
Nizam

References

Mughal nobility
1751 deaths
18th-century Indian royalty
18th-century Indian Muslims
Mughal Empire
Year of birth unknown